Terrebonne—Blainville was a federal electoral district in Quebec, Canada, that was represented in the House of Commons of Canada from 1997 until 2015.

It was created in 1996 out of parts of Blainville—Deux-Montagnes, Repentigny and Joliette ridings.

The 2012 federal electoral boundaries redistribution saw the riding abolished into Terrebonne, Thérèse-De Blainville and Mirabel.

Geography

The riding contains the towns of Blainville et Sainte-Anne-des-Plaines in the region of Laurentides, and the town of Terrebonne in Lanaudière.

The neighbouring ridings are Argenteuil—Papineau—Mirabel, Rivière-du-Nord, Montcalm, Alfred-Pellan, and Marc-Aurèle-Fortin.

Members of Parliament

Election results

Terrebonne—Blainville, 1997–2015

	 

	

Note: Conservative vote is compared to the total of the Canadian Alliance vote and Progressive Conservative vote in 2000 election.

See also
 List of Canadian federal electoral districts
 Past Canadian electoral districts

References

Campaign expense data from Elections Canada
Riding history 1997–present from the Library of Parliament
2011 Results from Elections Canada
Riding map for Terrebonne—Blainville, archived by Elections Canada

Notes

Blainville, Quebec
Former federal electoral districts of Quebec
Terrebonne, Quebec